A Haliya is an agricultural bonded labourer who works on another person's land. The literal meaning of Haliya is "one who ploughs". Haliyas can be found throughout Nepal. But the Haliya system in the far western hilly part of Nepal is considered a bonded labour system.

, the system has been abolished by the Nepalese Government. The effectiveness of this abolition, however, has been questioned.

See also
Haruwa–charuwa system
Kamaiya and kamlari

References

Debt bondage in Nepal
Society of Nepal
2008 disestablishments in Nepal